Gauri is a 1968 Hindi film with an ensemble cast including super stars Sunil Dutt, Sanjeev Kumar, Nutan, Mumtaz and Om Prakash. It is a remake of the Tamil film Santhi (1965).

Cast
 Sunil Dutt as Sunil
 Sanjeev Kumar as Sanjeev 
 Nutan as Gauri
 Mumtaz as Geeta
 Om Prakash as Seth Maniram
 Rajendra Nath as Radhe Shyam
 Laxmi Chhaya as Dhanwanti
 Urmila Bhatt as Basanti
 Leela Mishra as Sunil's Mother
 Shivraj as Ram Prasad

Soundtrack

Reception
The film received a high rating of 6.7 at the IMDb.

References

External links
 

Films scored by Ravi
1968 films
1960s Hindi-language films
Films directed by A. Bhimsingh
Hindi remakes of Tamil films